The seventh season of the American television series Whose Line Is It Anyway? premiered on ABC Family on January 17, 2005, and concluded on May 23, 2005.

Cast

Recurring 
Kathy Greenwood (nine episodes)
Chip Esten (six episodes)
Brad Sherwood (five episodes)
Greg Proops (four episodes)
Jeff Davis (one episode)

Episodes 

"Winner(s)" of each episode as chosen by host Drew Carey are highlighted in italics. The winner would take his or her seat and call a sketch for Drew to perform (often with the help of the rest).

External links
Whose Line Is It Anyway? (U.S.) (a Titles & Air Dates Guide)
Mark's guide to Whose Line is it Anyway? - Episode Guide

Whose Line Is It Anyway?
2005 American television seasons